Mihran-i Bahram-i Razi, better simply known as Mihran Razi, was an Iranian military officer from the Mihran family. He was killed in 637 at the battle of Jalula.

Biography 
Mihran is first mentioned during the Arab invasion of Persia, and is known to have commanded the left wing of the Sasanian army during the battle of al-Qādisiyyah. Mihran, along with Nakhiragan, Hormuzan and Piruz Khosrow, including the rest of the survivors, regrouped at Bavel (Babylon), where they tried to repel the Arab army, but were once again defeated. While Piruz and Hormuzan fled different directions, Mihran and Nakhiragan remained in Asoristan.

After a brief stay at Veh-Ardashir, they abandoned and destroyed the bridge on the east bank of the Tigris river. Nakhiragan and Mihran then briefly stayed at Kutha, where they installed a certain dehqan named Shahriyar as the commander of the garrison of the place. The two Sasanian military officers then went to the capital Ctesiphon, which was under attack by the Arabs. However, their stay there was only brief.

After some time, they regrouped again with other Sasanian officers and fought the Arabs at Jalula. The Sasanian forces, however, were once again defeated. Mihran along with the rest of the survivors then fled to Khanaqin, but were at last killed by an Arab force which had pursued them.

References

Sources 

 
 

Generals of Yazdegerd III
Year of birth unknown
637 deaths
Military personnel killed in action
House of Mihran
People from Ray, Iran
7th-century Iranian people